The Brevard-Macon House, also known as the Wharton House, is a historic house in Woodbury, Tennessee, U.S.. It was built in 1896 for William Ferrell Brevard, the owner of flour mills. It was purchased by E. L. Macon, the brother of country music artist Uncle Dave Macon, in 1926.

The house was designed in the Queen Anne architectural style. It has been listed on the National Register of Historic Places since December 23, 1994.

References

Houses on the National Register of Historic Places in Tennessee
Queen Anne architecture in Tennessee
Houses completed in 1896
Buildings and structures in Cannon County, Tennessee